Lacombe County is a municipal district in central Alberta, Canada. It is within in Census Division No. 8 north of the City of Red Deer.

Geography

Communities and localities 
The following urban municipalities are surrounded by Lacombe County.
Cities
Lacombe
Towns
Bentley
Blackfalds
Eckville
Villages
Alix
Clive
Summer villages
Birchcliff
Gull Lake
Half Moon Bay
Sunbreaker Cove

The following hamlets are located within Lacombe County.
Hamlets
Haynes
Joffre
Mirror (dissolved from village status)
Morningside
Tees

The following localities are located within Lacombe County.
Localities 

Alix South Junction
Aspen Beach
Birch Bay
Brighton Beach
Brook
Bullocksville
Burbank
Chigwell
Coghill

Deer Ridge Estates
Delaney
Ebeling Beach
Farrant
Forshee
Gilby
Heatburg
Hespero
Jackson

June
Kasha
Kootuk
Kuusamo Krest
Lamerton
Lochinvar
Lockhart
McLaurin Beach

New Saratoga Beach
PBI
Prentiss
Rosedale
Rosedale Valley
The Breakers
Wilson Beach
Woody Nook

Demographics 

In the 2016 Census of Population conducted by Statistics Canada, Lacombe County had a population of 10,343 living in 3,890 of its 4,668 total private dwellings, a  change from its 2011 population of 10,307.

See also 
List of communities in Alberta
List of municipal districts in Alberta

References

External links 

 
Municipal districts in Alberta